This article lists described species of the family Asilidae start with letter K.

A
B
C
D
E
F
G
H
I
J
K
L
M
N
O
P
Q
R
S
T
U
V
W
Y
Z

List of Species

Genus Katharma
 Katharma sanguinaria (Oldroyd, 1960)

Genus Katharmacercus
 Katharmacercus flagellatus (Oldroyd, 1960)
 Katharmacercus matilei (Menier & Tsacas, 2001)

Genus Ktyr
Ktyr callarus 
Ktyr caucasicus 
Ktyr elegans 
Ktyr junctus 
Ktyr kazenasi 
Ktyr kerzhneri 
Ktyr normalis 
Ktyr protensis

Genus Ktyrimisca
 Ktyrimisca griseicolor (Lehr, 1964)
 Ktyrimisca rava (Lehr, 1967)
 Ktyrimisca setifemur (Lehr, 1967)
 Ktyrimisca stackelbergi (Lehr, 1967)

References 

 
Asilidae